HD 40409 is a suspected astrometric binary star system in the southern constellation of Dorado. It is a faint system but visible to the naked eye with an apparent visual magnitude of 4.65. It is moving further away with a heliocentric radial velocity of +25 km/s.

Based on the stellar classification of K2 III assigned by Gray et al. (2006), the visible component is a K-type giant star, evolved from an A-type main sequence star. In contrast, Keenan and McNeil (1989) gave it a somewhat less evolved classification of K2 III–IV. It is about eight billion years old with 12% more mass than the Sun, and has expanded to 4.8 times the Sun's radius. The star is radiating 11 times the Sun's luminosity from its enlarged photosphere at an effective temperature of 4,858 K.

References

K-type giants
Astrometric binaries
Dorado (constellation)
Durchmusterung objects
Gliese and GJ objects
Doradus, 36
040409
027890
2102